Joëlle van Koetsveld van Ankeren (born 2 June 1973) is a Dutch short track speed skater. She competed in two events at the 1992 Winter Olympics.

References

External links
 

1973 births
Living people
Dutch female short track speed skaters
Olympic short track speed skaters of the Netherlands
Short track speed skaters at the 1992 Winter Olympics
Sportspeople from Amsterdam
20th-century Dutch women